Tamchakett Airport  is an airport serving Tamchakett in Mauritania.

Airports in Mauritania